Daniel Sloss (born 11 September 1990) is a Scottish comedian, actor, and writer. 

Sloss was the youngest comedian to perform a solo season in London's West End, at the age of 19. He has toured internationally, released a stand-up comedy DVD through BBC Worldwide's 2Entertain label when he was 20, and has appeared on U.S. television shows such as Conan and The Late Late Show with Craig Ferguson.

In 2018, Sloss simultaneously released two hour-long comedy specials called DARK and Jigsaw via Netflix under the collective title Daniel Sloss – Live Shows, which received critical acclaim.

Early life
Daniel Sloss was born in Kingston upon Thames on 11 September 1990, the oldest of four children. He has two younger brothers, Matthew and Jack. His sister, Josie, was born with cerebral palsy in 1992 and died at age 7. He moved with his family to Scotland at the age of four, settling in Fife. He attended East Wemyss Primary School and Waid Academy in Anstruther. He was offered a place at the University of Dundee to study history, but decided to take a gap year to see if he could make comedy work as a full-time career; he officially declined the offer to study after performing at the 2008 Edinburgh Fringe Festival.

Comedy career

Stand up
When Sloss was sixteen, his mother met comedian Frankie Boyle and mentioned her son. Boyle offered Sloss work experience by writing a small amount of material for him in two series of BBC's Mock the Week. This was his first break and he credits Boyle for his initial success.

Sloss performed for the first time at The Laughing Horse in Edinburgh, August 2007, after completing a two-day stand-up comedy course. His first set was five minutes long. He ran his own monthly LOL comedy club at the Adam Smith Theatre in Kirkcaldy for a year when he was 18.

His first Edinburgh Festival Fringe was in August 2008, where he shared a show with fellow comic Davey See. Life in 2D ran for 10 days in the Espionage venue as part of the Free Fringe. That same Fringe, aged  17, Sloss became one of the youngest-ever finalists in the UK's premier So You Think You're Funny? comedy competition, the final of which is hosted by the Gilded Balloon venue during the Edinburgh Fringe. In 2009, he sold out his debut full-length Edinburgh Festival Fringe season Daniel Sloss – Teenage Kicks and in October took this show to London to the Soho Theatre to become the youngest comedian to perform a solo season in the venue as well as in London's West End.

In August 2010, Sloss's second solo show Daniel Sloss: My Generation sold out the entire run at Edinburgh Festival Fringe. The show later transferred to London for a season at the Soho Theatre in September before returning to London during the tour playing at the Bloomsbury Theatre in November. This show became his first ever headline live tour, and went on to tour Scotland throughout the autumn of 2010.

In August 2011, Sloss premiered his new show Daniel Sloss - The Joker at the Edinburgh Festival Fringe, selling out a nearly four-week run in the new 400-seat Assembly Theatre venue, still aged just 20. This was followed by a 50-date national tour in the autumn.

In 2012, he performed a 50-date UK tour of Daniel Sloss - The Show.

In August 2013, he launched his new show Daniel Sloss - Stand-Up at the Edinburgh fringe, again with an extended season at the Edinburgh International Conference Centre and again followed by a substantial autumn tour throughout the UK. He subsequently performed this show at 2014's Sydney International Comedy Festival and Perth International Comedy Festival.

In August 2014, his new show Daniel Sloss - Really...?! premiered at the Edinburgh fringe, again with an extended season at the Edinburgh International Conference Centre, followed by a substantial European tour of 20 shows in 15 countries in the autumn as well as UK dates.

In 2015, Daniel wrote and subsequently performed his 7th show at the Edinburgh Festival Fringe "DARK". "DARK" went on to tour for over 80 dates across 15 countries in Europe  and throughout the UK. In January, an extended hybrid version of "DARK" ran for a week at London's Soho Theatre (rebranded "DARK REVOIR" as DARK had been performed at the London's Royal Albert Hall, Elgar Room in December as part of the UK tour. In February, Daniel transferred the 90 minute version of his solo show (renamed "DARK") to New York for a week-long, off-Broadway run at the SoHo Playhouse as well for 2 shows in Los Angeles at the Westside Comedy Theatre. The New York Times featured Daniel on the front page of its Arts section
.

He opened for Dave Chappelle's two shows as well as starred in the "Best of Edinburgh" line-up at San Francisco's Sketchfest and returned to New York for the second off-Broadway run of his award-winning show "DARK" at the Soho Playhouse.

In February 2018, Sloss taped his comedy special DARK at the Belasco Theater in Los Angeles. Part of a two-special deal with Netflix, it was announced on 17 May that DARK and its sequel show So? would both be released later in 2018. Netflix released both shows on 11 September 2018, with So? being retitled Jigsaw. Sloss has claimed that Jigsaw caused over 120,000 break-ups, over 300 divorces, and hundreds more cancelled engagements.

August 2018 saw Sloss premiere his 10th solo show, Daniel Sloss: X during his 11th season at the Edinburgh Festival Fringe season. The subsequent tour again covers 25 European countries, ending with a new season in London's West End. The show received critical acclaim for Sloss' jokes about masculinity as well as its ending segment, a frank analysis of the rape of one his close friends by another friend and societal causes of sexual violence.

Television
He was the first stand-up comedian to perform on Channel 4's The Paul O'Grady Show (2009) and was commissioned by the BBC in April 2010 for a broadcast sitcom pilot, The Adventures of Daniel, which transmitted on 23 August 2010.

He featured on series 2 of BBC1's Michael McIntyre's Comedy Roadshow on 18 September 2010, and two weeks later on the first series of BBC2's The Rob Brydon Show alongside Stephen Fry as well as on Channel 4's 8 out of 10 Cats.

In January 2011 he performed on ITV1's Jason Manford's Comedy Rocks and in March 2011, was part of the BBC's Comic Relief marathon online broadcast with David Walliams called 24 Hour Panel People, as a panellist on Mock the Week.

The following year, Sloss featured on the BBC's Stand Up for Sport Relief performing a set as well as coaching heavy weight boxing champion Tyson Fury for the latter's stand-up comedy debut.

In September 2012, he recorded a TEDx Talk in Ealing and performed on Set List: Stand-up Without A Net for Sky Atlantic, alongside an all-star lineup of US and international comedy alumni. In October 2012, Sloss appeared in the seventh series of Russell Howard's Good News.

In December 2013 he made his USA television debut with an appearance on Conan,  he has since appeared a further 8 times. In addition, Daniel signed a talent deal with Conan O'Brien's production company Conaco to develop his own shows. He also appeared on the Pete Holmes Show, @Midnight, The Late Late Show with Craig Ferguson and back in the UK was featured on ITV's Sunday Night at the Palladium.

Along with a number of fellow comedians, including Kai Humphries and Tom Stade, he wrote, co-produced and starred in 6-part internet sitcom M.U.F.F.

Sloss also appeared in Beardyman's One Album Per Hour as part of Beardyman's 2 part YouTube series; other guest producers included Tim Minchin and Jack Black.

In the first half of 2017 he featured on Comedy Central's Drunk History re-telling the story of William Wallace (portrayed by Keith Allen) as well as the Dave Channel's Dara O’Briain's Go 8 Bit. Later that autumn Sloss appeared on Comedy Central's Roast Battle with his episode's battle with USA's Desiree Burch getting the highest ratings of the series.

In 2018, Sloss appeared on the second series of Roast Battle, winning the battle against Phil Wang.

Personal life
In February 2021, Sloss announced he was engaged to Kara Mitchell. They live in Edinburgh. Their first child together was born in February 2022.

Sloss' hobbies include gaming, watching Robot Wars (in which he appeared as a member of the Bot Out of Hell team in 2002) and comedy films, and playing football. He is a supporter of English football team Chelsea FC. He has several tattoos such as a portrait of Nikola Tesla, cartoon tigers drawn in the style of Calvin and Hobbes, a picture of Anthony and the Aardvark, and an image of the Joker.

Television appearances
Robot Wars, 2002
The Paul O'Grady Show, 2009
Most Annoying People of 2009, 2009
Good News Week 2010
Cracker Night 2010
The Adventures of Daniel, 2010
Michael McIntyre's Comedy Roadshow, 2010
The Rob Brydon Show, 2010
The Most Annoying People of 2010, 2010
Jason Manford's Comedy Rocks, 2011
Comic Relief's 24 Hour Panel People, Mock the Week, 2011
Comic Relief's Stand Up for Sport Relief, 2011
8 out of 10 Cats, 2010-2011 (2 appearances)
Alexander Armstrong's Big Ask, 2012
BBC Edinburgh Comedy Marathon, 2012
Russell Howard's Good News Extra, 2012
Comedy World Cup, 2012
Soccer AM, 2012
Cracker Night, 2013
The Pete Holmes Show, 2014
@midnight, 2014
The Late Late Show With Craig Ferguson, 2014
Sunday Night at the Palladium, 2014
The John Bishop Show, 2015
Drunk History, 2017
Roast Battle, 2018 (2 appearances)
Conan, 2013-2019 (10 appearances)
SophieCo. Visionaries: Being offended by a joke is narcissism – stand-up comedian, 2021
The Graham Norton Show, 2021

Tours
2008 Life in 2D
2009 Daniel Sloss – Teenage Kicks
2010 Daniel Sloss – My Generation
2011 Daniel Sloss – The Joker
2012 Daniel Sloss – The Show (EICC Edinburgh International Conference Centre + touring)
2013 Daniel Sloss – Stand-Up (EICC Edinburgh International Conference Centre + touring)
2014 Daniel Sloss – Really...?! (EICC Edinburgh International Conference Centre + touring)
2015 Daniel Sloss – DARK (EICC Edinburgh International Conference Centre + touring)
2016 Daniel Sloss – SO? (EICC Edinburgh International Conference Centre + touring)
2017 Daniel Sloss – NOW (EICC Edinburgh International Conference Centre + touring)
2018 Daniel Sloss – X (EICC Edinburgh International Conference Centre + touring)
2020/2021 Daniel Sloss – HUBRIS
2022/2023 Daniel Sloss – CAN'T

Stand-up specials

References

External links
 

1990 births
British people of Irish descent
Living people
Edinburgh Festival performers
British stand-up comedians
British male comedians
British male television actors
People educated at Waid Academy
21st-century Scottish comedians
Scottish male comedians